Cy Chris Thompson (born 1 July 1988 in Saint Thomas) is a Virgin Islands sailor.

College 
He claimed the 2008 ICSA Men's Singlehanded National Championship in his sophomore year and finished runner-up at the 2010 national championship and placed in the top ten in his fourth berths at singlehanded nationals. He was the 2011 NEISA Sailor of the Year and was a finalist for the 2011 Everett Morris Memorial Trophy as College Sailor of the Year. He was a three-time ICSA Coed All-American and piloted the A Division boats that helped RWU win the 2011 ICSA Team Racing National Championship and finish second in the 2012 ICSA Coed Dinghy National Championship.

Olympic Games 
He competed at the 2012 Summer Olympics in the Men's Laser class. Cy Thompson qualified for the 2016 Summer Olympics and was the Virgin Islands' flag bearer. He finished 19th in the Men's Laser class competition.  His grandfather, Rudy Thompson, was also an Olympic sailor for the Virgin Islands.

References

External links
 
 
 

1988 births
Living people
People from Saint Thomas, U.S. Virgin Islands
United States Virgin Islands male sailors (sport)
Olympic sailors of the United States Virgin Islands
Sailors at the 2012 Summer Olympics – Laser
Sailors at the 2016 Summer Olympics – Laser
Pan American Games competitors for the United States Virgin Islands
Sailors at the 2015 Pan American Games
Roger Williams Hawks sailors